Manjil (also Romanized as Manjīl and Menjīl ; derived from Manzil) is a city in the Central District of Rudbar County, Gilan Province, Iran. At the 2006 census, its population was 16,028, in 4,447 families.

Geography
Manjil is known as the windy city of Iran, a reputation it owes to its geographical position in the Alborz mountain range at a small cleft in Alborz that funnels the wind through Manjil to the Qazvin plateau.  The biggest wind farm of Iran, the Manjil and Rudbar Wind Farm, is located near Manjil.

Manjil is known for the river Sefīd-Rūd (or "Sepid Rood", "Sefid Rood", "white river"). It passes by the town and is formed in Manjil by two joining rivers. Since 1960 it has been the site of the Manjil Dam that significantly contributes to Gilan's agriculture, such as its olive groves, while generating electric power. The reservoir impounded by the Manjil Dam adds to the beauty of the area.

History
Throughout the history Manjil has been a gate to the southern Caspian Sea region. There are numerous archaeological site excavations (mostly illegal) in the Manjil area because of its rich cultural history. Some of these sites are related to the Ismaili era, i.e., Hassan Sabbah movement based in Alamoot forte (one may find artifacts from the 3rd-2nd millennia BC in some households).

Modern history
In the modern era, Manjil was the site of a historical battle between the nationalist revolutionary forces of Jangal (led by Mirza Koochak Khan) and the joint British and White Russian forces on June 12, 1918. The latter forces (led by General Dunsterville and Colonel Bicherakhov) willing to pass through Manjil as the only passage to the Caspian to reach Baku and overthrow the newly formed Baku Commune (led by Stepan Shahumian). General Dunsterville's private diaries and notes, including those kept during his command of the Dunsterforce Mission to North Persia and Baku, 1918 were transcribed from the original by General Dunsterville's great granddaughter, and are co-located on the Great War Primary Documents Archive.

Although devastated by a 1990 Manjil–Rudbar earthquake of magnitude 7.3, for the last few decades Manjil has enjoyed industrial and economic growth.

People
Manjil had a mainly Azerbaijani Turkish population from the ʿAmmārlu tribe, together with Tats and Kurds.

References

External links
General Dunsterville's diary - Great War Primary Documents Archive

Cities in Gilan Province
Populated places in Rudbar County
Settled areas of Elburz
Cities destroyed by earthquakes